The King of Everything Else is the third studio album by American rapper Slaine. It was released on August 19, 2014 through Suburban Noize Records.

Track listing

Charts

References

External links

2014 albums
Suburban Noize Records albums
Albums produced by DJ Lethal
Albums produced by Statik Selektah
Hip hop albums by American artists